The Buros Center for Testing is an independent, non-profit organization within the Department of Educational Psychology at the University of Nebraska–Lincoln that continues the mission of its founder, Oscar Krisen Buros, to provide critical reviews of published tests in clinical and educational psychology. It is recognized as a world leader in the review of published tests. Following the founder's death in 1978, his widow Luella Buros moved the center to its current location and expanded Buros' original focus by including coverage of Spanish tests, providing test reviews through academic databases and online download, and more generally advancing the quality of testing. The center maintains a public library of tests published after 1929 and also provides consultation and training related to testing.

The Buros Center comprises three distinct units that, together, provide unique products and services for the testing and assessment community. The Test Reviews and Information unit publishes three reference volume series—Mental Measurements Yearbook, Tests in Print, and Pruebas Publicadas en Español: An Index of Spanish Tests in Print—that offer descriptive information and critical appraisals of commercially available tests. The Psychometric Consulting unit offers consultation services that assist proprietary testing programs in improving the quality of their programs and validity of results. The Psychometric Consulting unit also offers auditing and accreditation services for licensure and certification tests. The Assessment Literacy unit develops programming and collaborative research to deepen the understanding of testing and assessment practices.

History 
Oscar Krisen Buros (1906-1978) was a professor of measurement and statistics in the Rutgers School of Education when he published a comprehensive review of psychological tests in 1938, called the Mental Measurements Yearbook (MMY). It has been updated regularly ever since, with 19 subsequent editions through 2017. In a profile in Time in 1939, Buros explained that he relied upon outside experts to provide reviews, utilizing 133 reviewers in the first edition, and 245 for the second edition.  He indicated that he was motivated to start the project due to his belief that nine out of ten published tests were unreliable. He indicated that he was sometimes threatened with lawsuits from test publishers. Towards the end of his career, he allowed that about half of the published tests had become were worthy of publication.

Over the course of his 40-year editorship of the MMY, Oscar and his wife Luella Buros published eight MMYs, and also began publishing  a cumulative reference book, Tests in Print, in 1961, and a series of monographs on specialized tests. The MMY has been updated regularly since 1938. Upon his death, the Buros Institute of Mental Measurement moved to the University of Nebraska–Lincoln, where it has remained. It was renamed the Buros Center for Testing in 1994.

Products and services 
The center's reviews provide detailed information and critical test appraisal targeted towards professionals, written by independent reviewers who fulfill their requirement of doctoral-level education with a background in psychometrics. The reviews are available by the following means:

Mental Measurements Yearbook 

A series of reference books that provide periodic updates covering English language tests that have been published or changed since the prior edition. The first edition was published in 1938 and the most recent, the twenty-first, was published in 2021.

Tests in Print 
A comprehensive bibliography to all known commercially available tests that are currently in print in the English language. The first volume of Tests in Print (TIP) was published in 1961, and the most recent edition, the TIP IX, in 2016.

Many tests listed in TIP are cross referenced to reviews of those tests in the Mental Measurements Yearbook. Tests in Print is a cumulative series. Unless a test is determined to be out of print or the publisher has chosen not to share test materials for description-writing purposes, test listings will continue to be included in each subsequent volume, with new and updated information added. Many tests listed in TIP are cross referenced to reviews of those tests in the Mental Measurements Yearbook. Tests in Print is a cumulative series. Unless a test is determined to be out of print or the publisher has chosen not to share test materials for description-writing purposes, test listings will continue to be included in each subsequent volume, with new and updated information added.

Pruebas Publicadas en Español: An Index of Spanish Tests in Print 
A bilingual reference volume designed to help Spanish and English speakers locate information about commercially available tests in the Spanish language. The first volume was published in 2013. The second edition, which includes descriptions of more than 600 tests, was published in 2018. PPE serves as a Spanish-language version of Tests in Print. Test descriptions are provided in a side-by-side Spanish/English language format and include information about a test's population, purpose, country and language of origin, norms, translation/adaptation process, scores, and which components are in Spanish.

Entries in Pruebas Publicadas en Español (PPE) offer descriptions of a wide range of Spanish-language assessments, including those developed entirely in Spanish, those containing only one or two Spanish forms and those providing Spanish administration instructions. Tests come from publishers around the world, including Spain, Mexico, Argentina, Chile, Puerto Rico, the United States, Israel, and the United Kingdom.

Test Reviews Online 
An online service at the center's website provides brief information on over 4,000 published tests and offers full reviews for purchase and immediate download.

Academic databases 
The center's test reviews are also available from EBSCO and Ovid/SilverPlatter, databases that can be found at many academic libraries.

Consultation and training 
The Buros Center provides consultation in psychometrics and data analysis. It provides webinars and periodic conferences that can be used for professional continuing education credits. It also publishes professional standards, codes, and guidelines for professional test users.

Library of Mental Measurements 
The center houses the Oscar K. Buros Library of Mental Measurements, a nearly complete collection of all English language tests published since 1930 that is available for public use.

References 

Psychological testing
Institutes
University of Nebraska System